Barnes School, Deolali, is a boarding school in west India. It was established in 1925, on the basis of a 1718 original foundation.

It is a private co-educational prep school. It is an Anglican school, founded in 1925, under the auspices of the Bombay Education Society. The school is twinned with Christ Church School, in Mumbai. Both schools follow the ICSE curriculum and use the same shield as a badge or logo, Barnes in blue and Christ Church in green. Barnes Junior College is affiliated to the Indian School Certificate/ISC. Barnes School and Junior College was started in 2008.

History

When the Revd. Richard Cobbe was appointed chaplain to the British East India Company factory at Bombay in colonial India, he founded, in 1718, a small free school where twelve poor boys were housed, clothed, fed and educated by one master. The school was in a building not far from the present Cathedral of St. Thomas in Fort. That charity school was the seed from which Barnes has sprung.

A hundred years passed by. Another East India Company chaplain, the Ven. Archdeacon George Barnes, realised that the charity school could not meet the needs of hundreds of children then without any education. So he appealed for funds and started the Bombay Education Society in 1815, the oldest society in the city interested in the welfare and upbringing of children. The first, small, school was taken over. Numbers grew until it was apparent that new grounds and school buildings were essential.

A large airy site at Byculla was given by the Government. Girls were also provided for. New school buildings were opened in 1825. One of the copper plates commemorating the opening is now on the wall of Evans Hall, Devlali. The other remains with Christ Church School, Byculla, which with the parish church there stands on part of the land given originally to the BES. Much of the land was later sold to help build Barnes.

The BES schools were primarily boarding schools for Anglo-Indian boys and girls, mainly belonging to the Anglican Church. However, day-scholars were admitted and they were of all castes and creeds. In the early 20th century the BES amalgamated with the Indo-British Institution, which had been founded about 1837 by the Revd. George Candy. Byculla was by then crowded and unhealthy. Plans, initiated by Sir Reginald Spence and Mr Haig-Brown, to move the boarding part of the schools away from Mumbai to the cooler and healthier Deccan Plateau began to take shape.

On 17 November 1923 Sir George Lloyd laid the foundation stone of Evans Hall. Less than two years later, on 29 January 1925, a special train brought the first boarders to Devlali and Barnes was declared open by Sir Leslie Wilson, Governor of Bombay and patron of the Bombay Education Society.

It is still primarily a place where the poor Anglo-Indian children of the Anglican and other Protestant Churchess can be given education. It is still a Church school where Christian ideals are practised and imparted.

The memory of founders and benefactors is preserved in the names of the buildings: Barnes, Candy, Spence, Haig-Brown, Lloyd. Other names are remembered. Greaves House is named after Sir John Greaves, a prominent Bombay businessman of the firm of Greaves Cotton, director of the Bombay Education Society from 1930 and Chairman of its Managing Committee from 1939 to 1949. Royal House commemorates Harry Royal, an old boy of the BES School from the years around 1900 to 1910, who became an officer of the Bombay Chamber of Commerce and honorary treasurer of the BES for many years. The greatest of them all was the Revd. Thomas Evans. After being Headmaster at the old school at Byculla since 1910, he became the first Headmaster of Barnes, without whom it would probably not have survived its early years. His portrait hangs in Evans Hall which was named in memory of him when he retired in 1934.

Sports and extra-curricular activities
Sports include football, cross country running, athletics, gymnastics, swimming, hockey, tennis, boxing, badminton, table tennis, basketball, and volleyball. Extra-curricular activities include debating, SUPW, singing, and elocution competitions.

Barnes has won the "All Maharashtra Anglo-Indian Schools Football Tournament" 11 out of the 18 times, including a record of 7 times in a row.

Second World War
W. R. Coles, Principal from 1934 to 1968, wrote of Barnes during the war years:

Past principals

Rev. T. Evans (1925 – 1934)
Mr. W. Coles (1934 – 1968)
Mr. J. Davis (1968 – 1985)
Mr. A. A Baker (1986 – 2000)
Mr. A. Temple (2001 – 2006)
Dr. L. C. Coutinho (2006 – 2009)
Mr. B. Martin (2009 – 2011)
Mr. J. Luke (2011–2018)
Mr. Ainsley Edgar (2018–present)

School coat of arms

The following description of the school arms has been received from the College of Arms, London:

It is a combination of the arms of Archdeacon Barnes, the Founder, on the left side, and that of his wife, who belonged to the Carnac family, on the right. On the left side is a blue shield with the faces of three white leopards and on the right, four-quarters alternately white and blue with crossed swords, three five-pointed stars and a crescent. The swords are in their natural steel colour with the points upward. The stars are blue over the white quarters and white over the blue. Similarly the crescent is white and blue. The bird is a white falcon with golden beak and legs. It is standing on a green mount with six alternate twists of white and blue underneath. The motto, in Latin, Accepto robore susgam can be translated, "I shall arise with the strength I have received."

School houses

Boys
The boys houses are named after school founders/benefactors:
 Candy – Green – Revd. George Candy
 Greaves – Blue – Sir John Greaves
 Royal – Red – Harry Royal
 Spence – Yellow – Sir Reginald Spence

Girls
The girls houses are named after women of historical significance:
 Joan of Arc – Green
 Edith Cavell – Red
 Helen Keller – Blue
 Florence Nightingale – Yellow

Notable alumni

 Vinod Khanna
 Dilip Kumar.
 Cyrus Todiwala
 Arshad Warsi
 Anil Yashwant Tipnis
Karambir Singh

References

External links
 
 Unofficial website
 Anil Tipnis at Barnes after being promoted to Chief of Air Staff
 The History of Barnes

Christian schools in Maharashtra
Boarding schools in Maharashtra
Education in Nashik district
Educational institutions established in 1925
Anglican schools in India
1925 establishments in India